The Retan House is a historic house at 2510 South Broadway in Little Rock, Arkansas.  It is a modest two-story frame structure, with shallow-pitch hip roof with broad eaves.  A single-story porch extends across the front, with a broad gable roof supported by stone piers.  The entrance is on the left side, and there is a three-part window at the center of the front under the porch.  Above the porch are a band of four multi-pane windows in the Prairie School style.  The house was built in 1915 to a design by Charles L. Thompson, and is one of his finer examples of the Prairie School style.

The house was listed on the National Register of Historic Places in 1982.

See also
National Register of Historic Places listings in Little Rock, Arkansas

References

Houses on the National Register of Historic Places in Arkansas
Prairie School architecture
Houses completed in 1915
Houses in Little Rock, Arkansas